The Chesapeake Dragons were an American soccer team, founded in 2001. The team was a member of the United Soccer Leagues Premier Development League (PDL), the fourth tier of the American Soccer Pyramid, until 2004, when the team left the league and the franchise was terminated.

The Dragons played their home games at the Maryland SoccerPlex in the city of Germantown, Maryland, 31 miles northwest of downtown Washington, DC. The team's colors were blue, silver and black.

Final Squad
vs West Virginia Chaos, 14 July 2004

Year-by-year

Stadia
 Bowie State Stadium, Bowie, Maryland 2003
 Maryland SoccerPlex, Germantown, Maryland 2004

Soccer clubs in Maryland
Defunct Premier Development League teams
2001 establishments in Maryland
2004 disestablishments in Maryland